Joka may refer to:

 Joka (rapper), Polish rapper, member of Kaliber 44
Joka, Kolkata, a locality in South West Kolkata, India, the home of IIM Calcutta
Joka metro station, Kolkata
Tilapia joka, species of aquarium fish
 Joka, a character in Klonoa: Door to Phantomile